Aeolidia is a genus of sea slugs, aeolid nudibranchs, marine gastropod mollusks in the family Aeolidiidae.

Species
Species within the genus Aeolidia include:
 Aeolidia campbelli (Cunningham, 1871)
 Aeolidia collaris Odhner, 1921
 Aeolidia filomenae Kienberger, Carmona, Pola, Padula, Gosliner, and Cervera, 2016
 Aeolidia herculea Bergh, 1894
Aeolidia libitinaria Valdés, Lundsten & N. G. Wilson, 2018 
 Aeolidia loui Kienberger, Carmona, Pola, Padula, Gosliner, and Cervera, 2016
 Aeolidia papillosa (Linnaeus, 1761)
Taxa inquirenda
 Aeolidia bella (Rüppell & Leuckart, 1830) (taxon inquirendum)
 Aeolidia pelseneeri Risbec, 1937 
Species brought into synonymy
 Aeolidia edmondsoni Ostergaard, 1955: synonym of Phestilla lugubris (Bergh, 1870)
 Aeolidia farallonensis Gosliner and Behrens, 1996: synonym of Aeolidia herculea Bergh, 1894
 Aeolidia grandis Volodchenko, 1941: synonym of Aeolidia herculea Bergh, 1894
 Aeolidia helicochorda M. C. Miller, 1988: synonym of Burnaia helicochorda (M. C. Miller, 1988)
 Aeolidia poindimiei Risbec, 1928: synonym of Phyllodesmium poindimiei (Risbec, 1928)
 Aeolidia serotina Bergh, 1873: synonym of Aeolidia campbelli (Cunningham, 1871)
 Aeolidia verrucosa M. Sars, 1829: synonym of Flabellina verrucosa (M. Sars, 1829)

References

 Backeljau, T. (1986). Lijst van de recente mariene mollusken van België [List of the recent marine molluscs of Belgium]. Koninklijk Belgisch Instituut voor Natuurwetenschappen: Brussels, Belgium. 106 pp.
 Vaught, K.C. (1989). A classification of the living Mollusca. American Malacologists: Melbourne, FL (USA). . XII, 195 pp. 
 Gofas, S.; Le Renard, J.; Bouchet, P. (2001). Mollusca, in: Costello, M.J. et al. (Ed.) (2001). European register of marine species: a check-list of the marine species in Europe and a bibliography of guides to their identification. Collection Patrimoines Naturels, 50: pp. 180–213

External links
 

Aeolidiidae
Taxa named by Georges Cuvier